Scharfenberg may refer to:

Conrad III of Scharfenberg
Scharfenberger chocolate
Scharfenberg coupler, a type of railway coupling

People with the surname Scharfenberg
Doris Scharfenberg

See also 
 Scharfenberg Castle (disambiguation)